Ricard "Riqui" Puig Martí (born 13 August 1999) is a Spanish professional footballer who plays as a midfielder for Major League Soccer club LA Galaxy.

Club career

FC Barcelona
Born in Matadepera, Barcelona, Catalonia, Puig joined FC Barcelona's La Masia in 2013, from UFB Jàbac Terrassa. After progressing through the youth setup, he made his senior debut with the reserves on 24 February 2018, coming on as a second-half substitute for Marcus McGuane in a 1–1 home draw against Gimnàstic Tarragona in the Segunda División championship.

On 11 June 2018, Puig renewed his contract with Barça until 2021, and was promoted to the B-team in the Segunda División B. He made his first team debut on 5 December, replacing fellow youth graduate Oriol Busquets in the 55th minute of a 4–1 home routing of Cultural Leonesa, in the season's Copa del Rey; he also assisted Denis Suárez, who scored Barcelona's fourth goal.

Puig made his La Liga debut on 13 April 2019, starting and playing 67 minutes in a 0–0 draw against Huesca. He scored his first goal for Barça B on 14 September, the second in a 2–2 home draw against AE Prat.

On 6 October 2020, Puig was promoted to the first team, being handed the number 12 jersey which was previously worn by Rafinha. 

On 13 January 2021, Puig scored the winning penalty in the penalty shootout (Barcelona won 3–2) after being held at 1–1 at the end of extra time by Real Sociedad in the Supercopa de España semi-final. On 24 January 2021, Puig scored his first goal for the first team in a 2–0 away win in La Liga against Elche, when he headed in Barcelona's second goal from a Frenkie de Jong assist.

LA Galaxy
On 4 August 2022, Puig joined Major League Soccer club LA Galaxy on a free transfer and signed a 3.5-year contract with Targeted Allocation Money. He made his debut on 19 August as a substitute against Seattle Sounders FC, contributing to a 3–3 draw. Puig scored his first MLS goal—a strike from outside the box in the 89th minute—in a 2–2 draw with Toronto FC on 31 August. He was positioned as a playmaker and averaged more than 75 passes per 90 minutes with a high rate of completion as the Galaxy lost only once in their final ten regular season matches. The team qualified for the 2022 MLS Cup Playoffs, where they were eliminated in the Western Conference Semifinals.

Style of play
A product of La Masia, is known to be a player capable of directing the motion of the game through his great attacking prowess. He has drawn comparisons to Andrés Iniesta in the past, however has struggled for playing time.

Personal life
Riqui Puig's father, Carlos, was also a footballer. A left-back, he spent his entire career representing Terrassa.

Career statistics

Honours
Barcelona Youth
 UEFA Youth League: 2017–18

Barcelona
 La Liga: 2018–19
 Copa del Rey: 2020–21

References

External links

LA Galaxy official profile

1999 births
Living people
People from Vallès Occidental
Footballers from Catalonia
Spanish footballers
Association football midfielders
La Liga players
Segunda División players
Segunda División B players
FC Barcelona Atlètic players
FC Barcelona players
Spain under-21 international footballers
Catalonia international footballers
LA Galaxy players
Major League Soccer players
Spanish expatriate footballers
Spanish expatriate sportspeople in the United States
Expatriate soccer players in the United States
Designated Players (MLS)